Ciaran McGovern (born ) is a Canadian former male volleyball player. He was part of the Canada men's national volleyball team. On club level he played for Swd Powervolleys Duren.

References

External links
 profile at FIVB.org

Place of birth missing (living people)
1989 births
Canadian men's volleyball players
Living people